Events from the year 1966 in Sweden

Incumbents
 Monarch – Gustaf VI Adolf 
 Prime Minister – Tage Erlander

Events

Popular culture

Music
Grimascher och telegram, album by Cornelis Vreeswijk

Births
 19 January – Yukiko Duke, journalist and translator
 5 August – Håkan Algotsson, ice hockey goaltender.
 12 October – Christian Due-Boje, ice hockey player.
 12 November – Anette Norberg, curler

Deaths

 19 April – Gösta Åsbrink, gymnast (born 1881).
 11 November – Carl Jonsson, tug-of-war competitor (born 1885).

References

 
Sweden
Years of the 20th century in Sweden